Jorge Pérez Sáenz (born 24 October 1975) is a Spanish retired footballer who played as a central midfielder, and a manager.

He amassed Segunda División totals of 165 matches and nine goals over seven seasons, with Extremadura, Almería, Córdoba and Lorca Deportiva. In La Liga, he appeared for Athletic Bilbao and Numancia (26 games).

Playing career
Born in Bilbao, Biscay, Pérez made his senior debut with Zamudio SD in Tercera División. After a one-year spell with CD Aurrerá de Vitoria, he joined Athletic Bilbao; initially assigned to the reserves in Segunda División B, his first La Liga match with the first team occurred on 15 February 1998 when came on as a 52nd-minute substitute for Mikel Lasa in a 0–3 home loss against Valencia CF; he scored his only goal for them in the penultimate group stage fixture of the 1998–99 UEFA Champions League, a 2–1 away defeat to Rosenborg BK. 

In 1999, Pérez moved to another top-flight club, CD Numancia. The following year, he signed for CF Extremadura of the Segunda División.

In the summer of 2002, Pérez joined UD Almería still in the second division. After being ever-present during the 2003–04 season, he agreed to a contract at Córdoba CF.

Following a six-month spell at third-tier side UB Conquense, Pérez signed with Lorca Deportiva CF one level above in July 2006. After suffering relegation he took his game to the lower leagues, representing in quick succession CD Roquetas, Caravaca CF, Lorca Deportiva, Lorca Atlético CF and CA Pulpileño; at the age of 36, he retired.

Coaching career
On 15 September 2016, Pérez became manager of Lorca FC's reserves. On 17 December of the following year, after the dismissal of Curro Torres, he was named caretaker of the first team; he was in charge for one match before the appointment of Fabri, and returned to his previous role.

On 5 July 2018, Pérez joined Joseba Etxeberria's coaching staff at CD Tenerife.

References

External links

1975 births
Living people
Spanish footballers
Footballers from Bilbao
Association football midfielders
La Liga players
Segunda División players
Segunda División B players
Tercera División players
Zamudio SD players
Bilbao Athletic footballers
Athletic Bilbao footballers
CD Numancia players
CF Extremadura footballers
UD Almería players
Córdoba CF players
UB Conquense footballers
Lorca Deportiva CF footballers
CD Roquetas footballers
Caravaca CF players
Lorca Atlético CF players
Spanish football managers
Segunda División managers
Lorca FC managers
CD Aurrerá de Vitoria footballers